The Tanzer 10 is a Canadian sailboat, that was designed by Dick Carter and first built in 1980.

The design was later developed into the Tanzer 10.5.

Production
The boat was built by Tanzer Industries Limited in Dorion, Quebec. The company entered bankruptcy in 1986 and production had ended by then.

Design
The Tanzer 10 is a small recreational keelboat, built predominantly of fibreglass, with wood trim. It has a masthead sloop rig, a transom-hung rudder, wheel steering and a fixed fin keel or optionally a swing keel. The boat displaces  and carries  of ballast.

The boat is powered by a Japanese-made Yanmar diesel engine. It has a pilothouse and inside steering.

See also
List of sailing boat types

Similar sailboats
Abbott 33
Alajuela 33
Arco 33
C&C 3/4 Ton
C&C 33
C&C 101
C&C SR 33
Cape Dory 33
Cape Dory 330
CS 33
Endeavour 33
Hans Christian 33
Hunter 33
Hunter 33-2004
Hunter 33.5
Hunter 333
Hunter 336
Hunter 340
Marlow-Hunter 33
Mirage 33
Moorings 335
Nonsuch 33
Viking 33
Watkins 33

References

Keelboats
1980s sailboat type designs
Sailing yachts
Sailboat type designs by Dick Carter
Sailboat types built by Tanzer Industries